Gone Country is an American celebrity reality television show in which contestants compete to become a country music singer. The winner gets a country single produced by host John Rich, one-half of the country duo Big & Rich. It aired on CMT, with reruns on TV Land, and VH1. On the first-season finale, Julio Iglesias Jr. was named the winner.

Season 1 contestants
Bobby Brown – an R&B star of the late 1980s and early 1990s, member of boy band New Edition.
Maureen McCormick – best known from her role as Marcia Brady from the hit television show The Brady Bunch.
Diana DeGarmo –  American Idol season 3 runner-up and a Broadway actress
Julio Iglesias Jr. – son of singer Julio Iglesias, brother of Enrique Iglesias, and a soulful dance-pop singer. (Winner) 
Sisqó – Member of the R&B group Dru Hill. He is most widely known for his solo hit, the "Thong Song."
Dee Snider – lead singer of the 1980s heavy metal band Twisted Sister.
Carnie Wilson – daughter of Beach Boys front man Brian Wilson, Carnie Wilson was also a member of the pop band Wilson Phillips.

Season 2 contestants
Jermaine Jackson – a member of The Jackson 5 alongside brothers Michael, Marlon, Tito and Jackie.
Chris Kirkpatrick – member of the boy band *NSYNC.
Sean Young – Appeared in movies such as Ace Ventura: Pet Detective, Fatal Instinct, Wall Street, No Way Out and Blade Runner.
Mikalah Gordon – American Idol season 4 finalist
Sebastian Bach – Former lead singer of the glam metal band Skid Row. (Winner)
Lorenzo Lamas – played "Tom Chisum" in Grease and starred on Falcon Crest, Renegade and The Bold and the Beautiful.
Irene Cara – played "Coco Hernandez" in the film Fame in 1980 and also is best known for the theme songs for both "Fame" and Flashdance. Left the show in episode 2 after Sean Young's drunken actions during the night.

Season 3 contestants
Tara Conner – Miss USA 2006
Micky Dolenz – former Monkees singer and drummer
George Clinton – funk master; leader of the band Parliament-Funkadelic
Richard Grieco – 21 Jump Street actor
Taylor Dayne – 1980s pop star
Sheila E. – Drummer and singer (Winner)
Justin Guarini –  American Idol season 1 runner-up

See alsoOutsiders Inn'', the 2008 reality television series spin-off featuring McCormick, Brown, and Wilson.

References

External links
Official homepage

2008 American television series debuts
CMT (American TV channel) original programming
VH1 original programming
2000s American reality television series
2009 American television series endings